The Space Operations Center ( - COPE) is a facility in Brasília operated by the Aerospace Operations Command to control and oversee the Brazilian satellites and other space activities.

History and mission
The COPE was inaugurated on 23 June 2020 by President Jair Bolsonaro. The main mission of the facility is the operation and control the SGDCs satellites in partnership with Telebras. Other space activities will be conducted from the COPE as part of the Brazilian Space Agency operations.

References

Space program of Brazil
Brazilian Air Force
Space units and formations
2020 establishments in Brazil